Generation Investment Management LLP (Generation IM) is a financial services and investment management firm founded in 2004. It was co-founded by former US Vice President Al Gore and Goldman Sachs' Asset Management head David Blood, with a stated emphasis on sustainable investment options for their mutual funds and other investments.

Generation has offices in London and San Francisco, and employed 87 people in 2017. Generation Investment Management LLP is authorized and regulated by the Financial Conduct Authority in the UK. The firm's advisory board, chaired by Gore, meets twice a year.

Generation has built a global research platform to integrate sustainability research into fundamental equity analysis.

History 
Generation was founded in April 2004 by a group of seven founding partners led by Al Gore and David Blood. The firm began investing client money in April 2005. Its goal was integrating the disciplines of finance and sustainability. The firm places environmental and social factors at the core of its strategy.

Later in 2005, Generation helped to establish the Enhanced Analytics Initiative to support sell-side research into long-term sustainability risks and opportunities. One of the founding partners joined the initial working group responsible for bringing the UNPRI to life.

In November 2007, Generation and Kleiner Perkins announced a global collaboration to "find, fund and accelerate green business, technology and policy solutions with the greatest potential to help solve the current climate crisis." As part of the collaboration, prominent Kleiner Perkins partner John Doerr joined Generation's Advisory Board. In this year, Generation also attended the Bellagio Summit, where the term 'impact investment' was coined.

In 2014, Generation launched Climate Solutions Fund II and the foundation partnered with George Serafeim. In 2015, Generation launched the Sustainability Insights Series, releasing "Environmental Intelligence" and "The Power Industry in Transition." In the same year, Generation became a Certified B Corp.

Partnerships 
 The Alliance for Climate Protection (Repower America)
 World Resources Institute
 Natural Resources Defense Council
 The Climate Project

Investments
Investments by Generation funds include:
 New Resource Bank
 Octopus Energy Group
 Proterra

References

External links
  Generation Investment Management Profile from the Financial Times (requires log-in)
 For People and For Planet, a 3/28/06 op-ed in The Wall Street Journal by Al Gore and David Blood
 We Need Sustainable Capitalism, an 11/5/08 op-ed in The Wall Street Journal by Al Gore and David Blood
 When Principles Aid Performance, an article about the firm from the Financial Times, April 2007
 Generation Announces Plans For New Investment Management Firm, the November 2004 press release
 SEC Regulatory Information and Disclosed Holdings
 Al Gore and David Blood interviewed by WIRED, April 2018

Al Gore
Investment management companies of the United Kingdom
2004 establishments in the United Kingdom
Financial services companies established in 2004
Companies based in the City of Westminster